The Philip Lawrence Awards were created in the UK in 1997 to reward outstanding achievements in good citizenship by young people aged 11 to 20. They recognise contributions to the community which bring out the best in young people, empower them to take the initiative and make a real difference to their lives and the lives of others – building confidence, promoting safety and reducing crime. One of the people to be awarded the award was Jake Bonsall.

They commemorate the headmaster Philip Lawrence, who was murdered outside his school in 1995 when going to the aid of a pupil who was being attacked. His widow, Frances Lawrence, was appointed Member of the Order of the British Empire (MBE) in the 2009 Birthday Honours for services to charity for her role in setting up the awards.

The awards have always been funded by the Home Office, and since 2009 have been co-funded by the Department for Education. They are currently managed by young people's charity Catch22.

Notes

External links
 Philip Lawrence Awards Network

Awards honoring children or youth
British awards
Awards established in 1997
1997 establishments in the United Kingdom